Statistics of Primera División Uruguaya for the 1976 season.

Overview
It was contested by 12 teams, and Defensor won the championship.

League standings

References
Uruguay - List of final tables (RSSSF)

Uruguayan Primera División seasons
Uru
1